This is a list of the municipalities in the state of Roraima (RR), located in the North Region of Brazil. Roraima is divided into 15 municipalities, which are grouped into 4 microregions, which are grouped into 2 mesoregions.

See also
Geography of Brazil

Roraima